The Ministry of Foreign Affairs of the Democratic People's Republic of Korea is the government ministry of North Korea, responsible for conducting foreign relations of the country. The Minister of Foreign Affairs is in charge of the ministry.

In addition to the foreign minister, the Ministry of Foreign Affairs has a First Vice Minister and seven other vice ministers. The current First Vice Minister is Kim Kye-gwan. The other vice ministers include Choe Son-hui, Han Song-ryol, and Choe Hui-chol.

The Ministry includes an organization called the Institute for American Studies.

List of officeholders
The following is a list of foreign ministers of North Korea since its founding in 1948:

See also
 List of diplomatic missions of North Korea
 List of diplomatic missions in North Korea

References

External links
 

North Korea
Foreign
Foreign Ministies
Politicians
Cabinet of North Korea